(9 June 1923 – 24 January 2022) was a Japanese professional golfer.

Professional career
Ishii was born in Shizuoka Prefecture, Japan, and started playing golf at the age of 15. Ishii won a number of events on the Japanese and Asian circuits through the 1950s and 1960s. One of his top triumphs was at the 1964 Capitol Hills Open in Manila, Philippines on the Far East Circuit. Ishii was tied for the lead with Australian golfer Peter Thomson at the beginning of the fourth round. He outshot Thomson by four strokes over the course of the final round to win.

His good play helped him earn three consecutive special foreign invitations to the Masters in the mid-1960s. He was one of the first Asian players to play in the event. He made the cut the first two years. He also represented Japan in the Canada Cup in 1963 and 1964.

Personal life and death
Ishii died on 24 January 2022, at the age of 98.

Professional wins

Japan wins
 1953 Yomiuri Pro Championship
 1961 Chunichi Crowns
 1963 Kanto Open, Golf Nippon Series
 1965 Kanto Open

Far East Circuit wins (4)
1964 Malayan Open, Capitol Hills Open
1965 Malayan Open
1967 Thailand Open

Senior wins
 1977 Japan PGA Senior Championship

Results in major championships 

CUT = missed the half-way cut
"T" = tied for place
Note: Ishii only played in the Masters Tournament.

Team appearances
 Canada Cup (representing Japan): 1963, 1964

References 

1923 births
2022 deaths
Japanese male golfers
Sportspeople from Shizuoka Prefecture